The General Assembly of Jász-Nagykun-Szolnok County is the local legislative body of Jász-Nagykun-Szolnok County in the Northern Great Plain in Hungary.

Composition

2019–2024 period
The Assembly elected at the 2019 local government elections, is made up of 18 counselors, with the following party composition:

After the elections in 2019 the Assembly controlled by the Fidesz–KDNP party alliance which has 11 councillors, versus 3 Jobbik, 1 Democratic Coalition (DK), 1 Momentum Movement, 1 Hungarian Socialist Party (MSZP), and 1 Our Homeland Movement (Mi Hazánk) councillors.

2014–2019 period
The Assembly elected at the 2014 local government elections, is made up of 18 counselors, with the following party composition:

After the elections in 2014 the Assembly controlled by the Fidesz–KDNP party alliance which has 11 councillors, versus 5 Jobbik, 2 Hungarian Socialist Party (MSZP) and 1 Democratic Coalition (DK) councillors.

2010–2014 period
The Assembly elected at the 2010 local government elections, is made up of 18 counselors, with the following party composition:

After the elections in 2010 the Assembly controlled by the Fidesz–KDNP party alliance which has 11 councillors, versus 5 Hungarian Socialist Party (MSZP) and 4 Jobbik councillors.

Presidents of the Assembly
So far, the presidents of the Jász-Nagykun-Szolnok County Assembly have been:

 1990–1994 Lajos Boros, Hungarian Democratic Forum (MDF)
 1994–1998 Imre Iváncsik, Hungarian Socialist Party (MSZP)
 1998–2002 Lajos Búsi, Fidesz
 2002–2006 István Tokár, Hungarian Socialist Party (MSZP)
 2006–2010 Andor Fejér, Fidesz–KDNP
 2010–2018 Sándor Kovács, Fidesz–KDNP
 2018–2019 Miklós Piroska, Fidesz–KDNP
 since 2019 Imre Hubai, Fidesz–KDNP

References 

Jász-Nagykun-Szolnok
Jász-Nagykun-Szolnok County